The North Karelian Group (Pohjois-Karjalan Ryhmä, P-KR) was a formation of the Finnish Army (1939) during the Winter War. It defended the wide stretch of border between the Finnish IV Corps and the troops around Suomussalmi. The North Karelian Group fought around Lieksa and Kuhmo where the Soviet 54th Division was defeated with motti tactics.

Order of battle
Detached Battalion 12
Detached Battalion 13
Detached Battalion 14
Detached Company Kaasila
4th Detached Battery (4.Er. Ptri)
Field Replacement Battalion of the North Karelian Group (I TP/P-KR)

Military units and formations of Finland in the Winter War
Military units and formations of Finland in World War II